Demis is a given name. Notable people with the name include:

Demis Grigoraș (born 1993), Romanian handball player
Demis Hassabis (born 1976), British artificial intelligence researcher, neuroscientist, video game designer, entrepreneur and board game player
Demis Nikolaidis (born 1973), Greek footballer
Demis Ohandjanian (born 1978), English footballer
Demis Roussos (1946–2015), Greek-Egyptian singer and musician